St. James Township is an inactive township in Phelps County, in the U.S. state of Missouri.

St. James Township takes its name from the community of St. James, Missouri.

References

Townships in Missouri
Townships in Phelps County, Missouri